Sedona is a 2011 American comedy-drama film directed by Tommy Stovall. The plot concerns the experiences of an advertising executive and a lawyer in Sedona, Arizona. Released theatrically in 2012, the film's cast includes Frances Fisher, Seth Peterson, Barry Corbin, Christopher Atkins, Lin Shaye, and Beth Grant.

Plot
The film contains two stories that take place in Sedona, Arizona. One story involves a successful advertising executive named Tammy (Frances Fisher) who, on her birthday, is driving from Portland to Phoenix to land the biggest client of her career until a wrong turn gets her lost and takes her into Sedona by mistake, where she is run off the highway by a tour plane making an emergency landing and right in the middle of town, and so she is forced to wait in Sedona while her damaged car is being repaired.

Across town, a lawyer named Scott (Seth Peterson) is hiking in the woods with his partner Eddie (Matt Williamson) and their two young sons. Eddie brought the workaholic Scott to Sedona for some rest and relaxation, but wind up in an unexpected adventure when 7-year-old Denny (Trevor Sterling Stovall) gets lost. The ensuing frantic search for Denny sends Scott into a profound life-changing journey that forces him to examine his own priorities and determine what's truly important in his life.

Meanwhile, Tammy unwittingly begins a spiritual transformation of her own as she encounters an array of the townspeople, each of them touching her in different meaningful ways. A chain of coincidences spirals her out of control, leaving her haunted by her past and forcing her to face her demons head on. Letting her guard down, she confronts the implausible possibility that she has been brought to Sedona for a reason.

Cast
 Frances Fisher as Tammy
 Seth Peterson as Scott
 Beth Grant as Deb Lovejoy
 Matt Williamson as Eddie
 Trevor Sterling Stovall as Denny
 Rand Schwenke as Jeremy
 Christopher Atkins as Pierce
 Barry Corbin as Les
 Tatanka Means as Chuck
 Lin Shaye as Claire
 Kylee Cochran as Alana
 Robert Shields as Sky
 Rachel Reenstra as Linda
 Andy Ridings as Pat

Reviews
Jason Buchanan of TV Guide wrote that viewers "will likely walk away smiling thanks to stunning cinematography that gives a genuine sense of place, two skillfully interwoven storylines, convincing performances by a talented cast, and a fantastic portrayal of two loving, supportive gay parents that makes their sexuality a complete non-issue."  Rotten Tomatoes Critic Mark R. Leeper gave Sedona a score of 7 out of 10. Bill Goodykoontz from The Arizona Republic, who gave the film 2 out of 5 stars, wrote "Tommy Stovall's film gets bogged down in a morass of clichés, stereotypical characters and over-the-top acting, much of it committed by Frances Fisher, who you'd think might know better."

References

External links
 
 
 

2011 films
Films set in Sedona, Arizona
Films shot in Arizona
American independent films
American comedy-drama films
Films about spirituality
American LGBT-related films
2010s English-language films
2010s American films